Busk Margit Jonsson (born 10 September 1929) is a Swedish Soprano opera singer.

Jonsson was born in Malung, Dalarna County.  She played many roles during her time at the Royal Swedish Opera from 1954 to 1983, and was awarded the prestigious "Jussi Björling scholarship" in 1975.

Jonsson has been guest host on the popular radio programme Sommar.

From 1964 to 1977 she was married to Swedish actor Helge Skoog. She had been married to opera singer Ingvar Wixell before then.

Filmography
1964 –  Svenska bilder 
1960 –  Carmen (TV)
1958 –  Min syster och jag (TV)  
1957 – Värmlänningarna
1953 – Bror min och jag  
1951 – Talande tråden

References

External links

1929 births
Living people
Sommar (radio program) hosts
Swedish operatic sopranos